American industrial rock band Nine Inch Nails have released 11 studio albums, one live album, three remix albums, two compilation albums, six extended plays, 20 singles, 10 promotional singles, four video albums and 31 music videos. Nine Inch Nails has also contributed to numerous film soundtracks as well as the soundtrack to the video game Quake.

Initial ambitions for Nine Inch Nails in 1988 were to release one 12-inch single on a small European label. With the addition of future singles "Head Like a Hole" and "Sin", many of these demo tracks would later appear in revised form on the band's debut studio album, Pretty Hate Machine. The album was released in October 1989 and peaked at number 75 on the Billboard 200 the following year. In response to pressures from TVT Records for a follow-up to Nine Inch Nails' commercially successful debut, Reznor began recording the Broken extended play in secret. The EP was released in September 1992 and reached number seven on the Billboard 200. Nine Inch Nails' second studio album, The Downward Spiral (1994), reached number two on the Billboard 200 and has sold over 3.7 million copies in the United States, remaining the band's highest-selling release in the US.

Five years elapsed before Nine Inch Nails' next major album, The Fragile, a double album that debuted at number one on the Billboard 200, selling 228,000 copies in its first week, but dropped from the top 10 afterward. Another six years elapsed before Nine Inch Nails' next studio album, With Teeth, which also debuted atop the Billboard 200. In 2007, the band released their fifth studio album, Year Zero, alongside an accompanying alternate reality game. Reznor announced in late 2007 that Nine Inch Nails had fulfilled its contractual obligations with Interscope Records, and would distribute its next major album independently. 

The band's final Interscope release was a remix album based on material from Year Zero. The first Nine Inch Nails album released independently was the instrumental Ghosts I–IV in March 2008, followed two months later by The Slip. Hesitation Marks, the band's eighth studio album, was released in August 2013 through Columbia Records, reaching number three on the Billboard 200. After teasing a release in early 2016, Nine Inch Nails began releasing a trilogy of new releases: the EPs Not the Actual Events in December 2016 and Add Violence in July 2017, followed by the band's ninth studio album, Bad Witch, in June 2018. On March 26, 2020, the band released the albums Ghosts V: Together and Ghosts VI: Locusts.

Albums

Studio albums

Live albums

Remix albums

Soundtrack albums
Quake, June 22, 1996

Compilation albums

Extended plays

Singles

Promotional singles

Chronology
Each official Nine Inch Nails release is chronologically ordered with a sequential number prefixed by the word "Halo". These numbers are sometimes modified for alternate versions of a release, such as the multiple releases of The Downward Spiral. Promotional-only releases do not have their own numbers, although the promotional singles for "Piggy" and "Hurt" were both labeled as "Halo Ten", a title later officially used for Further Down the Spiral. A US promo for "Into the Void" is mislabeled as Halo 16 because this number actually belongs to the Things Falling Apart remix album.

Pretty Hate Machine era (1989–1990)

 Halo 1: "Down in It" (1989)
 Halo 2: Pretty Hate Machine (1989)
 Halo 2R: Pretty Hate Machine: Remastered  (2010)
 Halo 3: "Head Like a Hole" (1990)
 Halo 4: "Sin" (1990)

Broken era (1992)
 Halo 5: Broken
 Halo 6: Fixed

The Downward Spiral era (1994–1997)
 Halo 7: "March of the Pigs" (1994)
 Halo 8: The Downward Spiral (1994)
 Halo 8 DE: The Downward Spiral: Deluxe Edition, reissue (2004)
 Halo 8 DVD-A: The Downward Spiral: DualDisc, reissue (2004)
 Halo 9: "Closer" (1994)
 Halo 10: Further Down the Spiral (1995)
 Halo 10 v2: Further Down the Spiral, European/Australian/Japanese release
 Halo 11: "The Perfect Drug" (1997)
 Halo 12: Closure (1997)

The Fragile era (1999–2002)
 Halo 13: "The Day the World Went Away" (1999)
 Halo 14: The Fragile (1999)
 Halo 30: The Fragile: Deviations 1 (2016)
 Halo 15: "We're in This Together" (1999)
 Halo 15 a: "We're in This Together CD1" (1999)
 Halo 15 b: "We're in This Together CD2" (1999)
 Halo 15 c: "We're in This Together CD3" (1999)
 Halo 16: Things Falling Apart (2000)
 Halo 17: And All That Could Have Been (2002), limited edition packaged with Halo 17b
 Halo 17a: And All That Could Have Been, live CD
 Halo 17b: Still, limited edition bonus CD

With Teeth era (2005–2007)
 Halo 18: "The Hand That Feeds" (2005)
 Halo 19: With Teeth (2005)
 Halo 19 DVD-A: With Teeth, DualDisc release
 Halo 20: "Only" (2005)
 Halo 21: "Every Day Is Exactly the Same" (2006)
 Halo 22: Beside You in Time (2007)
 Halo 22 HD: Beside You in Time, Live Blu-ray

Year Zero era (2007)
 Halo 23: "Survivalism" 
 Halo 24: Year Zero
 Halo 25: Year Zero Remixed

Ghosts I–IV era (2008)
 Halo 26: Ghosts I–IV, digital download
 Halo 26 CD: Ghosts I–IV, 2× CD
 Halo 26 V: Ghosts I–IV, 4× vinyl
 Halo 26 DE: Ghosts I–IV, Deluxe Edition
 Halo 26 LE: Ghosts I–IV, Ultra-Deluxe Limited Edition

The Slip era (2008)
 Halo 27: The Slip
 Halo 27 CD-LE: The Slip, Limited Edition CD with bonus DVD

Hesitation Marks era (2013)
 Halo 28: Hesitation Marks
 Halo 28dcd: Hesitation Marks, Deluxe Edition

The Trilogy era (2016–2018)
 Halo 29: Not the Actual Events (2016)
 Halo 30: The Fragile: Deviations 1 (2016)
 Halo 31: Add Violence (2017)
 Halo 32: Bad Witch (2018)

Ghosts V–VI era (2020)
 Halo 33: Ghosts V: Together (2020)
 Halo 34: Ghosts VI: Locusts (2020)

Other appearances

Remixes

Videography

Video albums

Music videos

Broken, the unreleased short film directed by Peter Christopherson, contains the videos for "Pinion", "Wish", and "Happiness in Slavery" as well as a video for "Help Me I am in Hell" and a different video for "Gave Up" from the one on Closure. The short film contains graphic depictions of a seemingly helpless victim being tortured and forced to watch Nine Inch Nails videos.

See also
 List of songs recorded by Nine Inch Nails

Notes

References

External links
 
 
 
 

Discography
Alternative rock discographies
Discographies of American artists
Heavy metal group discographies